Krupunder station is on the Hamburg-Altona–Kiel line and is a railway station served by the city trains of the Hamburg S-Bahn. The railway station is located in the municipality Halstenbek in the district of Pinneberg, in Schleswig-Holstein, Germany, directly at the border to Hamburg.

Station layout
The station is an elevated island platform with 2 tracks and one exit. The station is fully accessible for handicapped persons, because since 2014 there is a lift and a special floor layout for blind persons.

Station services

Trains
The rapid transit trains of the line S3 of the Hamburg S-Bahn are calling the station. Direction of the trains on track 1 is Pinneberg. On track 2 the trains are traveling in the direction Stade via Hamburg central station.

Buses
Several bus lines are calling a bus stop in front.

Facilities at the station
A small shop in the station sells fast food and newspapers. There are no lockerboxes. No personnel is attending the station, but there are SOS and information telephones, ticket machines, 30 bicycle stands and 56 park and ride parking lots.

See also
Hamburger Verkehrsverbund HVV

References

External links
DB station information 

Hamburg S-Bahn stations in Schleswig-Holstein
Buildings and structures in Pinneberg (district)
Railway stations in Germany opened in 1967
1967 establishments in West Germany